The Dr. Frank Davis House is a historic house at 25 Elm Street in Quincy, Massachusetts.  The -story wood-frame house was built in the 1890s by a local doctor.  It is one of the city's best-preserved Shingle style houses, complete with a period carriage (although it has been altered to accommodate automobiles).  The house's front facade features a large gable that sweeps down to the first floor level, with decorative cut shingles at the upper levels, and bay window sections joined by arched woodwork.

The house was listed on the National Register of Historic Places in 1989.

See also
National Register of Historic Places listings in Quincy, Massachusetts

References

Houses in Quincy, Massachusetts
Queen Anne architecture in Massachusetts
Houses completed in 1890
Shingle Style houses
National Register of Historic Places in Quincy, Massachusetts
Houses on the National Register of Historic Places in Norfolk County, Massachusetts
1890 establishments in Massachusetts
Shingle Style architecture in Massachusetts